The Mount Sinai Journal of Medicine is a peer-reviewed medical journal that was published continually between 1934 and 2012 by the Mount Sinai Hospital, New York, later by the Mount Sinai School of Medicine.

The journal is issued six times a year and contains clinical articles from all medical disciplines. In January 2007, John Wiley & Sons assumed publishing responsibilities and re-launched the journal as Mount Sinai Journal of Medicine: A Journal of Translational and Personalized Medicine, the focus being on the evolving nature of clinical care.

References

External links 
 

Publications established in 1934
English-language journals
Icahn School of Medicine at Mount Sinai
General medical journals
Bimonthly journals